Peter Dyos (born 12 April 1980) is a former professional English darts player who formally played in Professional Darts Corporation events.

He earned a PDC Tour Card in 2014, and qualified for the 2014 UK Open, but lost in the first round.

Career

Start of Darts Career 
Pete started playing darts when he was young eventually playing for Super League Darts before moving to Cambridgeshire where he joined the local team and gained experience he joined Men's A team and played with people such as Martin Adams

Gaining Experience (2013) 
In 2013 Pete went to Q-School where he failed to gain a tour card but the fact that he gained points meant he was able to play on a handful of events gaining experience during this time he was able to become friends with Dave Chisnall he also qualified for the UK Open where he lost in the First Round

Pro Tour (2014-2015) 
In 2014 Pete went back to Q-School this time successfully gaining a tour card for 2 years where he played in events and gained money and experience he also qualified for the Gibraltar Darts trophy where he lost in the second round to Justin Pipe

Challenge Tour (2016-2017) 
In 2016 Pete went back to Q-School where he failed to gain a tour card for another 2 years so only played a handful of events he started playing on the challenge tour right through to around September 2017 when Pete announced on Twitter he would taking a year out of darts

References

External links
Profile and stats on Darts Database

1980 births
Living people
English darts players
People from Cambridgeshire
21st-century English people